Roger J. Mackay (31 March 1956 – 17 June 2002) was an Australian professional golfer.

Career
Mackay turned professional in 1983 and played on both the PGA Tour of Australasia and the Japan Golf Tour. 

His greatest successes came in Japan, where he won on eight occasions including finishing second on the money list in 1991. 

In Australia he is best remembered for his 1987 win at the Australian PGA Championship. He also won the 1987 Victorian Open by a shot over Greg Norman. 

In 1991 Mackay was named Western Australian Sports Star of the Year.

Mackay last played professional golf in 2001.

Personal life
Mackay was educated at Christ Church Grammar School and graduated from the University of Western Australia.

Mackay died the in Perth at the age of 46 in 2002. He was survived by his wife, two sons and a daughter.

Amateur wins
1979 Western Australian Amateur
1980 Western Australian Amateur, Australian Amateur

Professional wins (15)

Japan Golf Tour wins (8)

*Note: The 1991 Mizuno Open was shortened to 54 holes due to rain.
1Co-sanctioned by the Asia Golf Circuit

Japan Golf Tour playoff record (1–0)

PGA Tour of Australasia wins (2)

PGA Tour of Australasia playoff record (0–2)

Other wins (5)
1983 Spalding Park Open (as an amateur)
1984 American Samoan Open
1986 Paratonga Open, Western Australia PGA Championship, Spalding Park Open

Results in major championships

CUT = missed the half-way cut
"T" = tied
Note: Mackay only played in The Open Championship and the PGA Championship.

Team appearances
Amateur
Sloan Morpeth Trophy (representing Australia): 1982 (tied)

Professional
World Cup (representing Australia): 1988
Four Tours World Championship (representing Australasia): 1991

References

External links
Obituary at the PGA Tour of Australasia website

Australian male golfers
PGA Tour of Australasia golfers
Japan Golf Tour golfers
1956 births
2002 deaths